Christopher Marsh (born 14 January 1970 in Dudley, West Midlands) is an English former professional footballer best known for his time playing in the Football League for Walsall.

Career
Marsh grew up in Sedgley and was a pupil at Queen Victoria Primary School and then Dormston School. He began his footballing career as a trainee with Walsall in 1986, joining the club on leaving school, and went on to make 470 appearances in thirteen seasons. He helped the club to promotion in 1995 and 1999. He played primarily as a fullback but, due to his versatility, played in virtually every position on the field for Walsall.

In January 2001, feeling that he had gone stale, he requested a transfer and joined Wycombe Wanderers in March 2001 for a transfer fee of £30,000. After only six months at Wycombe, he joined Northampton Town for a fee of £10,000 on a two-year contract, saying, "It has been a strange experience for me. I went to Wycombe last March but they have changed their system and I have been a victim of that. Lawrie Sanchez said he wanted me to stay but [Northampton manager] Kevin Wilson was a big factor in my decision." He made 43 appearances for Northampton in two seasons that were interrupted by an Achilles problem that ruled him out for over three months in 2002. After Northampton were relegated at the end of the 2002–03 season, he was released by the club and retired from the game.

Honours
Walsall
Football League Third Division runner-up: 1994–95
Football League Second Division runner-up: 1998–99

References

External links

English footballers
Association football fullbacks
Northampton Town F.C. players
Walsall F.C. players
Wycombe Wanderers F.C. players
People from Sedgley
Living people
1970 births
Coventry City F.C. non-playing staff